Ernest Cranfield Tedder (5 September 1915 – 9 September 1972) was an English cricketer.  Tedder was a right-handed batsman.  He was born at Woodford Green, Essex.

Tedder served in World War II with the Royal Air Force Volunteer Reserve, initially holding the rank of acting pilot officer. He was later promoted to flying officer in July 1941. Following the war, Tedder played first-class cricket for Essex against Somerset in the 1946 County Championship.  He made seven further first-class appearances in that season, with his final appearance coming against Sussex. In his eight first-class appearances, he scored 208 runs at an average of 14.85, with a high score of 55. This score, which was his only half century, came against Sussex.

He died on 9 September 1972 at Ipswich, Suffolk.

References

External links
Ernest Tedder at ESPNcricinfo
Ernest Tedder at CricketArchive

1915 births
1972 deaths
People from the London Borough of Redbridge
English cricketers
Essex cricketers
Royal Air Force Volunteer Reserve personnel of World War II
Royal Air Force officers